Evander Holyfield vs. Dwight Muhammad Qawi II was a professional boxing match contested on December 5, 1987 for the WBA and IBF cruiserweight titles.

Background
On August 15, 1987, Evander Holyfield would make the third successful defense of his WBA cruiserweight title and first of the IBF version by defeating Ossie Ocasio via 11th-round knockout, while on the undercard Dwight Muhammad Qawi would knockout former cruiserweight champion Lee Roy Murphy to earn the IBF's number one ranking, setting up a rematch from the previous year between the two. In their previous meeting, Qawi and Holyfield would go the distance with Holyfield earning a close split decision victory and becoming the new WBA cruiserweight champion. Qawi would then get an opportunity at rematch, facing Ossie Ocasio in an IBF "eliminator" bout with the winner facing the winner of the Holyfield–Parkey unification fight (which Holyfield would win via TKO in the third round), but he would lose a controversial majority decision and Ocasio would get a shot at Holyfield instead. However, due to the controversial nature of the loss, the IBF gave Qawi another chance at a title shot and he was matched up with Lee Roy Murphy with the winner earning the next shot at Holyfield, provided he defeat Ocasio after the Qawi–Murphy bout. After Qawi and Holyfield earned TKO victories, the rematch was set. It would be the final 15-round title bout sanctioned by the WBA.

The fight
In contrast to their previous fight, Holyfield would defeat Qawi in the fourth round by technical knockout. With almost a minute left in the round, Holyfield dropped Qawi on the seat of his trunks, though Qawi quickly got back up and continued the fight. Qawi attempted to fight back, but after missing a right hook, Holyfield countered with a right hand of his own that caught Qawi flush and sent him down again. Qawi was unable to answer the 10-count, giving Holyfield the victory by knockout at 2:30 of the round.

Fight card

References

1987 in boxing
Muhammad Qawi II
December 1987 sports events in the United States
Boxing matches at Boardwalk Hall